The Ertel Funeral Home, at 42 N. Market St. in Cortez, Colorado, was listed on the National Register of Historic Places in 1995.

It was designed by Denver architect Walter H. Simon, and "is an interesting interpretation of the Mission style that incorporates Pueblo Revival elements."  It was built in 1936.

References

National Register of Historic Places in Montezuma County, Colorado
Mission Revival architecture in Colorado
Buildings and structures completed in 1936
Pueblo Revival architecture in Colorado